Archery is one of the first sports to be competed at 1960 Summer Paralympics. Its competing athletes are wheelchair users

Medal table 
Updated to the 2016 Summer Paralympics.

Medalists

Defunct events 
 List of defunct archery events
 Advanced metric round open (held between 1976 and 1984)
 Albion round open (held between 1964 and 1968)
 Columbia round open (held between 1960 and 1968)
 FITA round open (held between 19 and 19)
 Novice round open (held in 1976)
 Short metric round open (held in 1972 to 1984)
 St. Nicholas round open (held between 1960 and 1976)
 Windsor round open (held in 1960)

Current events

Men's events

Men's individual wheelchair 1 (W1)

Men's individual wheelchair 2 (W2)

Men's individual open (standing)

Men's wheelchair team (W1/2)

Men's teams open (standing)

Women's events

Women's wheelchair (W1/2)

Women's individual open (standing)

Women's teams open (W1/2)

References

Lists of Paralympic medalists
Archery at the Summer Paralympics
Paralympic